Vau i Dejës Castle is a ruined castle in Vau i Dejës, northern Albania. The ruined St. Mark's Church inside the castle is a Cultural Monument of Albania.

References

Buildings and structures in Vau i Dejës
Ruined castles in Albania